No Idols is a collaborative mixtape by rapper Domo Genesis and record producer The Alchemist. It was released on August 1, 2012, by Odd Future Records. The mixtape was entirely produced by Alchemist and features guest appearances from Earl Sweatshirt, Vince Staples, Action Bronson, Smoke DZA, Freddie Gibbs, Prodigy, SpaceGhostPurrp and Tyler, The Creator.

Release and promotion
The lead single "Elimination Chamber" featuring Earl Sweatshirt, Vince Staples, and Action Bronson was released on July 16, 2012. The limited vinyl edition of the mixtape was released on October 1, 2013.

Track listing
All tracks are produced by The Alchemist.

Notes

 "Fuck Everybody Else" features additional vocals by Left Brain.

References

2012 albums
Albums produced by the Alchemist (musician)
Collaborative albums